This article describes the current structure of the Australian Army. It includes the army's order of battle and the headquarters locations of major units.  Members of the Australian Army also serve within joint units of the Australian Defence Force which fall outside the direct command of the Australian Army.

Overview
The Australian Army is organised into three main elements which report to the Chief of Army, the Headquarters of the 1st Division, Special Operations Command and Forces Command. Headquarters 1st Division is responsible for high-level training activities and is capable of being deployed to command large scale ground operations. It does not have any combat units permanently assigned to it, though it commands units during training activities and the Land Combat Readiness Centre reports to the divisional headquarters.

Most of the Army's units report to Forces Command, which is responsible for overseeing their readiness and preparing them for operations. This organisation came into effect during January 2011. Before this time the Army's three regular brigades were permanently assigned to the Headquarters 1st Division.

Current order of battle 

The following order of battle describes the Army's current organisational structure at the battalion and independent company/squadron level. It does not take into account changes to units' structure and command arrangements associated with operational deployments.

Chief of Army 
 Chief of Army
 Forces Command
 1st Division
 2nd Division
 Special Operations Command
 Army Aviation Command

Forces Command 
 Forces Command
 Headquarters, Forces Command (Victoria Barracks, NSW)
 Army Logistic Training Centre
 Defence Combat Support Training Centre
 Combined Arms Training Centre (including B Squadron, 3rd/4th Cavalry Regiment)

1st Brigade 
 1st Brigade
 Headquarters, 1st Brigade (Robertson Barracks, Northern Territory)
 5th Battalion, Royal Australian Regiment (motorised infantry) (Robertson Barracks, NT)
 8th/12th Regiment, Royal Australian Artillery (M777 howitzer) (Robertson Barracks, NT)
 1st Combat Engineer Regiment (Robertson Barracks, NT)
 1st Combat Signal Regiment (Robertson Barracks, NT)
 1st Combat Service Support Battalion (Robertson Barracks, NT)

3rd Brigade 
 3rd Brigade
 Headquarters, 3rd Brigade (Lavarack Barracks, Queensland)
 2nd Cavalry Regiment (armoured cavalry regiment) (Lavarack Barracks, Qld)
 1st Battalion, Royal Australian Regiment (motorised infantry) (Lavarack Barracks, Qld)
 3rd Battalion, Royal Australian Regiment (mechanized infantry) (Lavarack Barracks, Qld)
 4th Regiment, Royal Australian Artillery (M777 howitzer) (Lavarack Barracks, Qld)
 3rd Combat Engineer Regiment (Lavarack Barracks, Qld)
 3rd Combat Signal Regiment (Lavarack Barracks, Qld)
 3rd Combat Service Support Battalion (Lavarack Barracks, Qld)

6th Combat Support Brigade 
 6th Combat Support Brigade
 Headquarters, 6th Brigade (Victoria Barracks, NSW)
 1st Intelligence Battalion (Victoria Barracks, NSW)
 1st Military Police Battalion (HQ at Victoria Barracks, NSW)
 6th Engineer Support Regiment (Gallipoli Barracks, Qld)
 7th Signal Regiment (Borneo Barracks, Qld)
 16th Regiment, Royal Australian Artillery (Woodside Barracks, SA)
 19th Chief Engineer Works (Randwick Barracks, NSW)
 12th Chief Engineer Works (Gallipoli Barracks, Qld)
 20th Regiment, Royal Australian Artillery (Gallipoli Barracks, Qld)

7th Brigade 
 7th Brigade
 Headquarters, 7th Brigade (Gallipoli Barracks, Qld)
 2nd/14th Light Horse Regiment (Queensland Mounted Infantry) (Gallipoli Barracks, Qld)
 6th Battalion, Royal Australian Regiment (mechanized infantry) (Gallipoli Barracks, Qld)
 8th/9th Battalion, Royal Australian Regiment (motorised infantry) (Gallipoli Barracks, Qld)
 1st Regiment, Royal Australian Artillery (M777 howitzer) (Gallipoli Barracks, Qld)
 2nd Combat Engineer Regiment (Gallipoli Barracks, Qld)
 7 Combat Signal Regiment (Gallipoli Barracks, Qld)
 7th Combat Service Support Battalion (Gallipoli Barracks, Qld)

9th Brigade 
 9th Brigade
 Headquarters, 9th Brigade (Keswick Barracks, SA)
 3rd/9th Light Horse (South Australian Mounted Rifles) (HQ at Smithfield, SA)
 1st Armoured Regiment (armoured cavalry regiment) (Horseshoe Lines, Edinburgh Defence Precinct, South Australia)
 10th/27th Battalion, Royal South Australia Regiment (HQ at Keswick Barracks, SA)
 7th Battalion, Royal Australian Regiment (mechanized infantry) (Edinburgh Defence Precinct, South Australia)
 3rd Field Squadron (HQ at Warradale Barracks, SA)
 144th Signal Squadron (HQ at Keswick Barracks, SA)
 9th Combat Service Support Battalion (HQ at Warradale Barracks, SA)

17th Sustainment Brigade 
 17th Sustainment Brigade
 Headquarters, 17th Sustainment Brigade (Randwick Barracks, NSW)
 145 Signals Squadron (Holsworthy Barracks, NSW)
 2nd Force Support Battalion (HQ at Derwent Barracks, Tasmania)
 9th Force Support Battalion (HQ at RAAF Base Amberley, Queensland)
 10th Force Support Battalion (HQ at Ross Island Barracks, Queensland)
 1st Health Battalion (HQ at Robertson Barracks, NT)
 2nd Health Battalion (HQ at Gallipoli Barracks, Qld)
 3rd Health Battalion (HQ at Keswick Barracks, SA)
 4th Health Battalion (HQ at Lavarack Barracks, Qld) (1st, 2nd, 3rd and 4th Health Battalions are to be moved to the future Re-raised 2nd Brigade (Renamed 2nd Health Brigade) in 2023)

1st Division 
 1st Division
 Headquarters, 1st Division (Gallipoli Barracks)
 Amphibious Task Group (Brisbane)
2nd Battalion, Royal Australian Regiment (amphibious infantry) (Lavarack Barracks)
 1st Signal Regiment (Enoggera)
 2/30th Training Group (RMAF Butterworth, Malaysia)
 39th Operational Support Battalion (Sydney)
 Combat Training Centre (Lavarack Barracks)

2nd Division 
 2nd Division
 Headquarters, 2nd Division (Randwick Barracks, NSW)
 8th Signal Regiment (HQ at Randwick Barracks, NSW)
 108th Signal Squadron (HQ at Simpson Barracks, Victoria) - 4th Brigade
 109th Signal Squadron (HQ at Irwin Barracks, WA) - 13th Brigade
 141st Signal Squadron (HQ at Lavarack Barracks, Qld) - 11th Brigade
 142nd Signal Squadron (HQ at Holsworthy Barracks, NSW) – 5th Brigade
 143rd Signal Squadron (HQ at HMAS Harman Canberra) – 2nd Division + 5th Brigade
 Operational Support Squadron (HQ at Randwick Barracks, NSW) - 2nd Division Sydney
 9th Regiment, Royal Australian Artillery, (HQ at Kogarah Barracks, NSW)
 2nd/10th Light Battery (HQ in Melbourne, Vic)
 5th/11th Light Battery (HQ at Lavarack Barracks, Qld)
 6th/13th Light Battery (HQ at Keswick Barracks, SA)
 7th Light Battery (HQ in Dee Why, NSW)
 23rd Light Battery (HQ at Kogarah Barracks, NSW)

4th Brigade 
 4th Brigade
 Headquarters, 4th Brigade (Simpson Barracks, Victoria)
 4th/19th Prince of Wales' Light Horse (HQ at Simpson Barracks, Victoria)
 5th/6th Battalion, Royal Victoria Regiment (HQ at Hawthorn, Victoria)
 8th/7th Battalion, Royal Victoria Regiment (HQ at Ballarat, Victoria)
 12th/40th Battalion, Royal Tasmania Regiment (HQ at Anglesea Barracks, Tasmania)
 22nd Engineer Regiment, Royal Australian Engineers (HQ at Ringwood East, Victoria)
 4th Combat Service Support Battalion (HQ at Broadmeadows, Victoria)

5th Brigade 
 5th Brigade
 Headquarters, 5th Brigade (Holsworthy Barracks, NSW)
 1st/15th Royal New South Wales Lancers (Lancer Barracks, NSW)
 1st/19th Battalion, Royal New South Wales Regiment (HQ at Orange, New South Wales)
 2nd/17th Battalion, Royal New South Wales Regiment (HQ at Pymble, New South Wales)
 4th/3rd Battalion, Royal New South Wales Regiment (HQ at Sutherland, New South Wales)
 41st Battalion, Royal New South Wales Regiment (HQ at Lismore, New South Wales)
 5th Engineer Regiment (HQ at Holsworthy Barracks, NSW)
 5th Combat Service Support Battalion (HQ at (Holsworthy Barracks, NSW)
 8th Combat Service Support Battalion (HQ at Timor Barracks, NSW)

8th (Training) Brigade 
 8th (Training) Brigade
 Headquarters, 8th Brigade (Timor Barracks, NSW)
 Adelaide Universities Regiment (HQ at Hampstead Barracks, SA)
 Melbourne University Regiment (HQ at Carlton, Victoria)
 Queensland University Regiment (HQ at St Lucia, Qld)
 Sydney University Regiment (HQ at Darlington, New South Wales)
 University of New South Wales Regiment (HQ at Kensington, New South Wales)
 Western Australia University Regiment (HQ at Leeuwin Barracks, WA)

11th Brigade 
 11th Brigade
 Headquarters, 11th Brigade (Lavarack Barracks, Qld)
 12th/16th Hunter River Lancers (Bushmaster PMV)(HQ at Tamworth, New South Wales)
 9th Battalion, Royal Queensland Regiment (HQ at Gallipoli Barracks, Qld)
 25th/49th Battalion, Royal Queensland Regiment (HQ at Gallipoli Barracks, Qld)
 31st/42nd Battalion, Royal Queensland Regiment (HQ at Lavarack Barracks, Qld)
 11th Engineer Regiment (HQ at Gallipoli Barracks, Qld)
 11th Combat Service Support Battalion (HQ at Lavarack Barracks, Qld)

13th Brigade 
 13th Brigade
 Headquarters, 13th Brigade (Irwin Barracks, Western Australia)
 10th Light Horse Regiment (HQ at Irwin Barracks, WA)
 11th/28th Battalion, Royal Western Australia Regiment (HQ at Irwin Barracks, WA)
 16th Battalion, Royal Western Australia Regiment (amphibious infantry) (HQ at Irwin Barracks, WA)
 13th Engineer Regiment (HQ at Irwin Barracks, WA)
 13th Combat Service Support Battalion (HQ at Irwin Barracks, WA)

Regional Force Surveillance Group 
 Regional Force Surveillance Group
 Headquarters, Regional Force Surveillance Group
 51st Battalion, Far North Queensland Regiment (HQ at Cairns, Queensland)
 North-West Mobile Force (HQ at Larrakeyah Barracks, NT)
 Pilbara Regiment (HQ at Taylor Barracks, WA)
 Indigenous Development Wing

Special Operations Command 
 Special Operations Command
 Special Operations Headquarters (Headquarters Joint Operations Command, NSW)
Headquarters, Special Forces Group
 Special Air Service Regiment (Campbell Barracks, WA)
 1st Commando Regiment (HQ at Randwick Barracks, NSW)
 2nd Commando Regiment (Holsworthy Barracks, NSW)
 Special Operations Engineer Regiment (Holsworthy Barracks, NSW)
 Special Operations Logistics Squadron (Banksmeadow, NSW)
 Special Operations Training & Education Centre (SOTEC) (Lone Pine Barracks, NSW)
 Australian Defence Force School of Special Operations (Holsworthy, NSW)
 Australian Defence Force Parachuting School (HMAS Albatross, NSW)

Army Aviation Command 
Army Aviation Command
Headquarters, Army Aviation Command (Canberra)
 Army Aviation Training Centre, (Oakey, Qld)
16th Aviation Brigade
 Headquarters, 16th Aviation Brigade (Gallipoli Barracks, Qld)
 1st Aviation Regiment (Tiger ARH helicopters), (Robertson Barracks, NT)
 5th Aviation Regiment (MRH 90 Taipan and Chinook helicopters) (RAAF Base Townsville, Qld)
 6th Aviation Regiment (MRH 90 Taipan helicopters) (Holsworthy Barracks, NSW)

Royal Military College of Australia 
 Royal Military College of Australia (Duntroon Garrison, ACT) 
 Royal Military College, Duntroon (Duntroon Garrison, ACT)
 Army Recruit Training Centre (Blamey Barracks, NSW)
 Land Warfare Centre (HQ at Kokoda Barracks, Qld)

Geographic distribution

Corps and Regiments 
Corps in the Australian Army, are administrative groupings of soldiers with a common function to promote pride and esprit de corps.

See also
List of Australian Army Corps
List of Australian Army regiments
List of Australian military bases

References
Citations

Works consulted
 

 
 

Australian Army
 
Australian Army